Hinasuri is an extinct genus of rhea from the Montehermosan. Its fossils have been found in the Monte Hermoso Formation of Buenos Aires Province, Argentina. The type species is H. nehuensis. Hinasuri was a robust rheid bird, living at a time of increasingly extreme temperatures and decreased precipitation in the Pampean region during the Pliocene–Pleistocene.

References

Bibliography

Further reading 
 The Origin and Evolution of Birds by Alan Feduccia

Ratites
Pliocene birds of South America
Montehermosan
Neogene Argentina
Fossils of Argentina
Fossil taxa described in 1995